Small Town Story is a 1953 British thriller, directed by Montgomery Tully and starring Donald Houston and Susan Shaw (in a rare bad-girl role).  The film is set in the world of association football and features appearances from sporting legend Denis Compton and commentator Raymond Glendenning, as well as players from the Arsenal, Millwall and Hayes football teams.  It also features the only screen acting credit of Kent Walton, later to himself become a famous sports commentator.

The film soon disappeared from cinemas and its fate was unknown for several decades. The British Film Institute included it on its "75 Most Wanted" list of missing British feature films due to its perceived interest as a sporting period piece, the involvement of stars of the sporting world at the time, its curiosity value as the only known British black-and-white football-set thriller apart from The Arsenal Stadium Mystery, and increasing interest by film historians in Tully as a director. It has now been found, restored and released on DVD.

Plot
Canadian ex-serviceman Bob Regan (Walton) returns to Oldchester, the English town where he was stationed during the war, hoping to find Pat Lane (Shaw), the girl he fell in love with.  He meets up with Mike Collins (George Merritt), an old acquaintance who now manages Oldchester United, the local football club.  He also renews his friendship with Collins' daughter Jackie (Margaret Harrison).

Mike tells Bob of an odd proviso surrounding the allocation of £25,000 from the estate of a recently deceased businessman and supporter of the football club – if Oldchester United win promotion to the next division of the Football League that season the money is theirs, if not it goes to the man's nephew.  He remembers Bob as a skilful footballer, and asks him to sign up for the team to boost the promotion quest.  Bob agrees.

The nephew Nick Hammond (Wheatley) is determined that the money will be his, and is worried that Bob's football prowess may well propel the team to on-pitch success.  He is acquainted with Pat, now living in London, and persuades her to join him in a scheme to scupper Oldchester's chances.  Knowing of Bob's fondness for Pat, and that Pat cares nothing for Bob, he proposes that if Pat can tempt Bob away from Oldchester and the football team, and the team fails in its promotion bid, he will give her a share of the inheritance.  The mercenary Pat jumps at the prospect, begins to work her charms on Bob and soon lures him to London to be with her.  He is talent-spotted by scouts, and signed up by Arsenal F.C.

In due course Bob becomes aware of Pat's true colours, seeks his release from Arsenal and returns to Oldchester, where reformed jail-bird Tony Warren (Houston) becomes his unofficial bodyguard.  The end of the football season approaches with Oldchester needing to win their final home match to gain promotion.  The game starts well, with Bob's goal giving the team a half-time lead.  However Nick, in a last attempt to derail Oldchester's chances, succeeds in kidnapping Bob at the half-time interval.  Following a car chase involving Tony and Jackie, the tables are turned and Bob is freed.  He gets back to the football ground during the closing stages of the match, to find Oldchester trailing by one goal.  Returning to the pitch, he scores two late goals to seal Oldchester's victory, promotion and financial windfall.  As a bonus, he realises his attraction to Jackie and the couple embrace.

Cast

  Donald Houston as Tony Warren
  Susan Shaw as Pat Lane
  Alan Wheatley as Nick Hammond
  Kent Walton as Bob Regan
  George Merritt as Mike Collins
  Margaret Harrison as Jackie Collins
  Norman Williams as Elton

  Arthur Rigby as Alf Benson
  Michael Balfour as Turner
  Richard Wattis as Marsh
  Molly Weir as Maid
  Billy Milne as Trainer
  Denis Compton as himself
  Raymond Glendenning as himself

Reception
On its release, Small Town Story found little favour with critics.  The Monthly Film Bulletin said: "The film may find sympathy among incorrigible football fans (the matches are neatly staged and efficiently photographed) but the inadequacy of both script and direction severely limits its appeal".  Kine Weekly described it as "So-so quota support. The acting is very second eleven...it's definitely off-side".

See also
List of rediscovered films

References

External links 
 BFI 75 Most Wanted entry, with extensive notes
 
 

1953 films
1950s thriller films
British black-and-white films
British association football films
Films directed by Montgomery Tully
1950s rediscovered films
British thriller films
Rediscovered British films
Films scored by Eric Spear
1950s English-language films
1950s British films